Sabana Larga is a town in the San José de Ocoa province of the Dominican Republic.

Sources 

 – World-Gazetteer.com

Populated places in San José de Ocoa Province
Municipalities of the Dominican Republic